This is a list of foreign football players in Bulgarian A Professional Football Group. The players written with bold text are currently playing in the A PFG.

Bulgarian players naturalized and born abroad 
  Alexandre Barthe – Litex Lovech, Ludogorets Razgrad, CSKA Sofia 2008–15, 2017–18
  Aleks Borimirov – Levski Sofia 2016–
  Cicinho – Ludogorets Razgrad 2015–
  Ivan Čvorović – Chernomorets Burgas, Minyor Pernik, Ludogorets Razgrad, Botev Plovdiv 2008–
  Diego Ferraresso – Litex Lovech, Lokomotiv Plovdiv, Slavia Sofia 2008–10, 2012–16
  Ilian Iliev – Cherno More 2016–17
  Zoran Janković – Litex Lovech 2000–02, 2003–04, 2007–08
  Marcelinho – Ludogorets Razgrad 2011–
  Marquinhos – Belasitsa Petrich, CSKA Sofia, Pirin Blagoevgrad 2005–11, 2014–16
   Predrag Pažin – Levski Sofia, Lokomotiv Mezdra 1999–2001, 2009–10
  Tiago Silva – Litex Lovech, CSKA Sofia 2001–07
  Igor Tomašić – Levski Sofia 2005–08
  Lúcio Wagner – Cherno More, Levski Sofia 2002–10
 Wanderson – Ludogorets Razgrad 2014–
 Dominik Yankov – Ludogorets Razgrad, Botev Vratsa 2017–
  Zlatomir Zagorčić – Litex Lovech 1997–99, 2002–05

Listed by country

Afghanistan 
Faysal Shayesteh – Etar 1924 2013

Albania 
Skënder Begeja – Akademik Sofia 1948–50
Ditmar Bicaj – Belasitsa Petrich 2008–09
Flo Bojaj – Pirin Blagoevgrad, Etar Veliko Tarnovo 2018, 2018–2020
Alban Bushi – Litex Lovech 1997–99
Albi Dosti – Montana 2015
Jurgen Gjasula – Litex Lovech 2013–14
Edon Hasani – Litex Lovech 2012–13
Altin Haxhi – Litex Lovech, CSKA Sofia 1998–00, 2003–04
Albin Romain Hodza – Pirin Gotse Delchev, Lyubimets 2007 2012–14
Enco Malindi – Slavia Sofia, Spartak Varna 2007–09
Kushtrim Munishi – Lokomotiv Plovdiv 1995
Ndue Mujeci – Pirin Blagoevgrad, Dunav Ruse 2016–17
Andi Renja – Pirin Blagoevgrad 2017–18, Vitosha Bistritsa 2018–19
Muharrem Sahiti – Lokomotiv Plovdiv 1994–96
Klodian Semina – Belasitsa Petrich 2008
Armando Vajushi – Litex Lovech 2012–14

Algeria 
Mehdi Boukassi – Cherno More Varna 2019–20
Ahmed Touba – Beroe Stara Zagora 2019–20
Najib Ammari – Chernomorets, Levski Sofia 2013–14
Farid Benramdane – Minyor Pernik 2011–13
Sabri Boumelaha – Minyor Pernik 2012
Fadel Brahami – Minyor Pernik, Montana  2010–13, 2013–14
Farès Brahimi – Minyor Pernik 2011–13
Nassim Zitouni – Dunav 2018
Nabil Ejenavi – Montana 2016
Mehdi Fennouche – Lokomotiv Gorna Oryahovitsa, Vereya 2016–17, Cherno More Varna 2018–2019 
Salim Kerkar – Beroe Stara Zagora, Vereya 2014–2018
Jugurtha Hamroun – Chernomorets 2011–12
Ilias Hassani – Vereya, Cherno More Varna 2016–17 Arda Kardzhali, Beroe  2019–2021
Raïs M'Bolhi – Slavia Sofia, CSKA Sofia 2009–10, 2011–12, 2013–14
Amir Sayoud – Beroe Stara Zagora 2013
Yanis Youcef – Chernomorets 2013

Angola 
Aldaír Ferreira – Etar Veliko Tarnovo 2020–21
Amâncio Fortes – CSKA Sofia 2015
Luis Pedro – Tsarsko Selo 2020–21

Argentina 
Federico Varela – CSKA Sofia 2021–
Nicolás Femia – Etar Veliko Tarnovo 2020–
Franco Mazurek – Levski Sofia 2019–20
Jorge Broun – Ludogorets Razgrad 2017–2019
Santiago Villafañe – Montana 2017
José Luis Palomino – Ludogorets Razgrad 2016–17
Juan Manuel Varea – Cherno More Varna 2015
Guido Di Vanni – CSKA Sofia 2014
Elian Parrino – Lokomotiv Plovdiv 2014
Sebastián Sciorilli – CSKA Sofia 2012–13
Juan Pablo Compagnucci – Lokomotiv Plovdiv 2011–12
Lucas Trecarichi – CSKA Sofia 2010–11
Adrián Fernández – Cherno More, Chernomorets Burgas 2008–10
Roberto Carboni – Chernomorets Burgas 2009–10
Gaston Pisani – Vihren Sandanski 2008–09
Federico Villar – Spartak Varna 2008
Mauro Alegre – Botev Plovdiv 2006–09
Germán Pietrobon – Pirin Blagoevgrad, CSKA Sofia, Sportist Svoge 2007–2010
Emmanuel Martínez – Pirin Blagoevgrad 2008
Marcos Charras – CSKA Sofia 2002–05
Claudio Graf – Litex Lovech 2002–03
Marcelo Sarmiento – Litex Lovech 2002–03

Armenia 
Artashes Adamyan - Spartak Plovdiv 1994–96
Armen Ambartsumyan – Botev Plovdiv, Maarek Dupnitsa, Slavia Sofia 1997–2007
Tigran Gharabaghtsyan – Cherno More 2008
Razmik Grigoryan – CSKA Sofia, Spartak Varna 1994–95, 1996–97
Samvel Melkonyan – Chernomorets Burgas 2012
Rumyan Hovsepyan – Arda Kardzhali 2019-20

Australia 
Tomi Juric – CSKA Sofia 2019–20
Peter Makrillos – Slavia Sofia 2021–

Austria 
Deni Alar – Levski Sofia 2019–20
Edin Bahtić – Lokomotiv Plovdiv, Tsarsko Selo 2019–2020
Hidajet Hankič – Botev Plovdiv 2021–
Maximilian Karner – Levski Sofia 2015–16
Kenan Muslimović – Lokomotiv Plovdiv 2020
Patrick Wessely – Septemvri Sofia 2017

Azerbaijan 
Emin Quliyev – Litex Lovech 2001

Belgium 
Abdelhakim Bouhna – Lokomotiv Plovdiv 2018–19
Seydina Diarra – Vereya 2018
Emmerik De Vriese – Lokomotiv Plovdiv 2014–15
Christian Kabasele – Ludogorets Razgrad 2011–12
Faysel Kasmi – Cherno More Varna 2020–21
Jeanvion Yulu-Matondo – Levski Sofia 2011
Elisha Sam – Arda Kardzhali 2019–20

Belarus 
Uladzimir Shuneyka – Levski Sofia 2003

Benin 
Félicien Singbo – Lokomotiv Plovdiv 2008–10
Cédric Hountondji – Levski Sofia 2019 
Olivier Verdon – Ludogorets Razgrad 2020–
David Kiki – Montana, Arda Kardzhali 2020–21, 2021–2022

Bosnia and Herzegovina 
Edin Ademović – Belasitsa Petrich 2008–09
Džemal Berberović – Litex Lovech 2005–09, 2010–2011, 2013–2014
Hamza Čataković – CSKA Sofia 2021–2022
Dalibor Dragić – Levski Sofia, Cherno More, Marek Dupnitsa 2000–04
Goran Galešić – Botev Plovdiv 2014–2015
Suvad Grabus – Ludogorets Razgrad 2011–2012
Vladan Grujić – Litex Lovech 2006
Sead Halilagić – Slavia Sofia 2001–02
Sergej Jakirović – CSKA Sofia 2005–07
Mirza Mešić – Lokomotiv Sofia 2011–12
Bojan Trkulja – Beroe 2007

Brazil 
Lucas Dias – Tsarsko Selo 2021
Jonata Machado – Lokomotiv Sofia 2021
Marquinhos – Botev Plovdiv 2021
Alex Santana – Ludogorets Razgrad 2020–
Marquinhos Pedroso – Botev Plovdiv 2020–2021
Juninho – Arda Kardzhali 2020–2021
Lucas Willian – Arda Kardzhali, Tsarsko Selo, Beroe Stara Zagora 2019–2020, 2022–
Léo Fioravanti – Tsarsko Selo 2020
Cauly – Ludogorets Razgrad 2020–
Lucas Salinas – Lokomotiv Plovdiv 2020–2022
Anderson Barbosa – Botev Plovdiv 2020
Octávio – Beroe Stara Zagora, Lokomotiv Sofia 2020–21, 2021–
Anderson Cordeiro – Tsarsko Selo 2019–
Everton Dias – Tsarsko Selo 2019
Wesley Natã – Tsarsko Selo 2019–2020
Gustavo Carbonieri – Tsarsko Selo 2019–2021
Nando – Dunav Ruse 2019–20
Gustavo Busatto – CSKA Sofia 2019–
Taylon – Botev Plovdiv 2019
Ebert – Botev Plovdiv 2019
Rodrigo Henrique – Cherno More Varna 2019–2022
David Ribeiro – Ludogorets Razgrad 2019, Botev Vratsa 2019
Wanderson Viana – Beroe Stara Zagora 2018–19
Johnathan – Botev Plovdiv 2018–2021, Beroe Stara Zagora 2021–2022, CSKA 1948 2022–
Jorginho – Cherno More Varna 2018–2019
Geferson – CSKA Sofia 2018–
Evandro – CSKA Sofia 2018–2020
Paulinho – Levski Sofia 2018–2021
Rivaldinho – Levski Sofia 2018–2019
Luan Viana – Levski Sofia 2018–2019
Eliton Junior – Lokomotiv Plovdiv 2018–2019
Wiris – Lokomotiv Plovdiv 2018–2020
Júnior Brandão – Ludogorets Razgrad 2018–
Fabiano Alves – Septemvri Sofia 2018–2019
Victor Luiz – Septemvri Sofia 2018
Alfredo – Beroe Stara Zagora 2018
Diogo Campos – Botev Plovdiv 2018
Maurides – CSKA Sofia 2018
Duda – Dunav 2018
Gláucio – Dunav 2018
Esquerdinha – Dunav 2018
Luís Cláudio – Dunav 2018
Jatobá – Dunav 2017–18
Matheus Leoni – Beroe Stara Zagora, Arda Kardzhali 2017–2020
Henrique – CSKA Sofia 2017–2021
Rafael Forster – Ludogorets Razgrad 2017–2020
Renan dos Santos – Ludogorets Razgrad 2017–2021
Álvaro Juliano – Botev Plovdiv 2017–18
Fernando Karanga – CSKA Sofia 2017–19
Fernando Viana – Botev Plovdiv 2017–18, 2019
Gustavo Sauer – Botev Plovdiv 2017–18
Jean Patric – Septemvri Sofia 2017–18
Matheus Bissi – Slavia Sofia 2017
Alexandre Hans – Pirin Blagoevgrad 2016–2017
Felipe Brisola – Botev Plovdiv 2016–18
Gustavo Campanharo – Ludogorets Razgrad 2016–19
João Paulo – Botev Plovdiv, Ludogorets Razgrad 2016–2020
Rafael – Botev Plovdiv 2016
Danillo Bala – Montana 2016
Victor Golas – Botev Plovdiv 2015–16
Jonathan Cafú – Ludogorets Razgrad 2015–17
Natanael – Ludogorets Razgrad 2015–2019
Cicinho – Ludogorets Razgrad 2015–
Wanderson – Ludogorets Razgrad 2014–
Lucas Sasha – CSKA Sofia, Ludogorets Razgrad 2012–13, 2015–2019
Marcinho – Levski Sofia 2012–13
Elias – Beroe Stara Zagora, Vereya 2012–16, 2016–18
Juninho Quixadá – Ludogorets Razgrad 2011–18
Guilherme Choco – Ludogorets Razgrad, Montana, Lokomotiv Plovdiv 2011–2014, 2016, 2017–18
Júnior Moraes – CSKA Sofia 2011–2012
Lourival Assis – Chernomorets Burgas 2011–2012
Luiz Eduardo – Montana, Etar 1924 2010–2012
Mário Jardel – Cherno More 2010
Francisco Alberoni – Slavia Sofia 2010
Rodrigo Galatto – Litex Lovech 2010
Dalmo – Chernomorets Burgas 2010
Gabriel Atz – Chernomorets Burgas 2010–11
Jose Junior – Slavia Sofia, Levski Sofia 2009–13
Ademar Júnior – Cherno More, CSKA Sofia 2009–12
Doka Madureira – Litex Lovech 2009–11
Marco Tulio – Lokomotiv Mezdra 2009
Carlos – Slavia Sofia 2009
Everton Gilio – Lokomotiv Plovdiv, Minyor Pernik, Lokomotiv Sofia, Beroe Stara Zagora 2008–17
Diego Ferraresso – Litex Lovech, Lokomotiv Plovdiv, Slavia Sofia, Botev Vratsa 2008–2016, 2021–
Michel Platini – Chernomorets Burgas, CSKA Sofia, Ludogorets Razgrad, Slavia Sofia 2008–11, 2012–2014 
Dudu – Chernomorets Burgas 2008–10
Joãozinho – Levski Sofia 2007–11
Adriano Miranda – Litex Lovech 2008–10
Zé Soares – Levski Sofia 2007–10
Jean Carlos – Levski Sofia 2007–09
Beto – Belasitsa Petrich, Slavia Sofia, Montana 2007–09
Eli Marques – Belasitsa Petrich, CSKA Sofia, Cherno More, Slavia Sofia, Svetkavitsa, Lokomotiv Plovdiv, Etar 1924 2007–13 
Dudu Paraíba – Marek Dupnitsa, Litex Lovech 2006–09
Filipe Machado – CSKA Sofia 2007–09
Eriverton – Vihren Sandanski 2007–09
Miran – Vihren Sandanski 2007–08
Ademar – Vihren Sandanski 2007
Elton – Slavia Sofia 2007–08
Peris – Cherno More 2007–09
Djalma – Cherno More 2007
Fabinho Recife – Cherno More 2007
Beto – Litex Lovech 2007
Nei – CSKA Sofia 2007–08
Eduardo Du Bala – Belasitsa Petrich, Litex Lovech, Slavia Sofia (2006–09)
Markos Da Silva – Cherno More 2006–08
Tiago Treichel – Litex Lovech 2006
Tom – Litex Lovech, Botev Vratsa 2006–2011, 2013–2014, 2020–21
Júlio César – Belasitsa Petrich, Montana 2006, 2009
Dakson – Lokomotiv Plovdiv 2006–09, 2011–2012 
Alex dos Santos – Lokomotiv Plovdiv 2006
Diano – Belasitsa Petrich, Levski Sofia 2005–08
Sandrinho – Litex Lovech 2005–12
Joãozinho – Litex Lovech 2004–05
Léo Lima – CSKA Sofia 2003
Rodrigo Souza – CSKA Sofia 2003
Junivan – Lokomotiv Plovdiv, Belasitsa Petrich 2001–05, 2006–07
João Carlos – CSKA Sofia 2002–04
Agnaldo – CSKA Sofia 2002–03
Dedé – Litex Lovech 2002–03
Lúcio Wagner – Cherno More, Levski Sofia 2002–10
Tiago Silva – Litex Lovech, CSKA Sofia 2001–04, 2005–07
Henrique – Litex Lovech 2001–03
Gustavo – Levski Sofia 2002
William Batista – Levski Sofia 2001–02
Gaúcho – Levski Sofia 2001
Leonidas – Levski Sofia 2000–01
Vava – Belasitsa Petrich, Levski Sofia 2000–05
Rogério Pereira – Slavia Sofia, Belasitsa Petrich 1993–98

Burkina Faso 
Habib Bamogo – Botev Plovdiv 2013–2014
Issouf Ouattara – Chernomorets Burgas 2012–2013

Cameroon 
Pierre Fonkeu – Beroe Stara Zagora 2020
Raoul Loé – CSKA Sofia 2017–18 
Justin Mengolo – Levski Sofia 2016
Petrus Boumal – Litex Lovech, CSKA Sofia 2014–17
Franck Mbarga – Slavia Sofia 2014–2015
Njongo Priso – CSKA Sofia 2012–13
Alfred Mapoka – Botev Plovdiv 2009
Gustave Bahoken – Botev Plovdiv 2009
Marcel Elame – Beroe, Lokomotiv Plovdiv, Vihren Sandanski 2004–2009
Daniel Bekono – Beroe, CSKA Sofia 2003–2007, 2008–2009

Canada 
Alessandro Hojabrpour – Lokomotiv Plovdiv 2017–18
Milan Borjan – Ludogorets Razgrad 2014–17

Cape Verde 
Kukula – Beroe Stara Zagora 2020–2022
Steve Furtado – Beroe Stara Zagora 2020–2022, CSKA 1948 2022–
Patrick Andrade – Cherno More 2018–2020
Steven Pereira – CSKA Sofia 2018–19
Jerson Cabral – Levski Sofia 2017–2019
Gilson Varela – Etar Veliko Tarnovo 2018–19
Helton Dos Reis – Lokomotiv Sofia, Litex Lovech, Septemvri Sofia 2013–2015, 2017-2018
Nilton Fernandes – Chernomorets Burgas 2009–2010
Jair – CSKA Sofia 1996–98
Rodolfo Lima – Vihren Sandanski 2007–08
Platini – CSKA Sofia 2014–2015
Jerson Ribeiro – Etar 1924 (2013)
Garry Rodrigues – Levski Sofia 2013–14
José Rui – CSKA Sofia 2007–08
Sténio – Cherno More, Botev Plovdiv 2014–16

Central African Republic 
 Fernander Kassaï – Slavia Sofia 2014–2015
 David Manga – Beroe Stara Zagora 2016–2017
 Amos Youga – CSKA Sofia 2020–

Chad 
 Azrack Mahamat – Etar 1924, Lokomotiv Sofia 2012–2014

Chile 
Carlos Espinosa – FC Lyubimetz 2007 2011
Mario Núñez – Litex Lovech 2001–2002
Mario Nunes – Naftex Burgas 2003

Colombia 
Fáider Burbano – Botev Plovdiv 2020
Andrés Sánchez – Vitosha Bistritsa 2019
Jean Carlos Blanco – CSKA Sofia 2018
Sergio Castañeda – Septemvri Sofia 2018
Gustavo Culma – Litex Lovech, CSKA Sofia 2016–18
Rafa Pérez – Litex Lovech, CSKA Sofia 2015–2017
Henry Rojas – Litex Lovech 2015
Brayan Angulo – Ludogorets Razgrad 2014–2016
Wilmar Jordán – Litex Lovech, CSKA Sofia 2013–2016
Danilo Moreno Asprilla – Litex Lovech 2013–2015
Sebastián Hernández – Ludogorets Razgrad, Cherno More 2013–2015
Carlos Pimiento – CSKA Sofia 1990–1992
Hamilton Ricard – CSKA Sofia 2001–2002
Bernardo Redín – CSKA Sofia 1990–1991

Congo 
 Dominique Malonga – Lokomotiv Plovdiv 2020
 Gaius Makouta – Beroe Stara Zagora 2020–21
 Bradley Mazikou – CSKA Sofia 2019–
 Mavis Tchibota – Ludogorets Razgrad 2019–
 Dylan Bahamboula – Tsarsko Selo 2019–20
 Hugo Konongo – Cherno More Varna 2018–19
 Kévin Koubemba – CSKA Sofia 2016–18
 Christoffer Mafoumbi – Vereya 2015–16
 Férébory Doré – Botev Plovdiv 2014–15, 2019

Côte d'Ivoire 
Oumar Sako – Beroe Stara Zagora, Arda Kardzhali 2021-
Yaya Meledje – Septemvri Sofia, Botev Plovdiv, Beroe Stara Zagora 2016–2020
Quatara Mamadu – Bdin 2011–2012
Abudramae Bamba – Chernomorets Burgas, Lokomotiv Mezdra 2008–2010
Guillaume Dah Zadi – CSKA Sofia 2005–2007
Serge Yoffou – Dobrudzha Dobrich, Levski Sofia 1998–2001

Croatia 
Karlo Muhar – CSKA Sofia 2021–
Kristijan Kahlina – Ludogorets Razgrad 2021–
Zvonimir Mikulić – Levski Sofia 2021
Filip Mihaljević – Lokomotiv Plovdiv 2020–21
Christian Ilić – Lokomotiv Plovdiv 2020–21
Lovre Knežević – Arda Kardzhali, Etar Veliko Tarnovo 2020, 2021–
Mihovil Klapan – Lokomotiv Plovdiv 2020
Nediljko Kovačević – Slavia Sofia 2019
Filip Žderić – Botev Vratsa 2019
Nikola Marić – Lokomotiv Plovdiv 2019–20
Dante Stipica – CSKA Sofia 2018–19
Ante Aralica – Lokomotiv Plovdiv 2018–2020
Josip Tomašević – Lokomotiv Plovdiv 2018–2020, 2021–
Marko Pervan – Botev Plovdiv 2019
Vilim Posinković – Lokomotiv Plovdiv 2018–19
Antoni Milina – Lokomotiv Plovdiv 2018–2019
Duje Mrdeša – Lokomotiv Plovdiv 2018
Filip Mihaljević – Lokomotiv Plovdiv 2018
Jurica Buljat – Lokomotiv Plovdiv 2018
Igor Banović – Lokomotiv Plovdiv 2017–2019
Mateas Delić – Beroe 2017
Mario Rašić – Neftochimic Burgas 2016
Mario Brkljača – CSKA Sofia 2015
Marin Oršulić – CSKA Sofia 2014–2015
Tonći Kukoč – CSKA Sofia 2014–2015
Goran Blažević – Levski Sofia 2013–2014
Tomislav Mišura – Lokomotiv Sofia 2006
Victor Špišic – Beroe, Lokomotiv Sofia 2005–2010
Vanja Džaferović – Beroe, Lokomotiv Sofia, Beroe 2005–07, 2008–2010, 2011–2012
Matija Matko – CSKA Sofia 2004–05

Curaçao 
Nigel Robertha – Levski Sofia 2019–2021
Jeremy de Nooijer – Levski Sofia 2015–2017
Dustley Mulder – Levski Sofia 2010–2014
Civard Sprockel – CSKA Sofia, Botev Plovdiv 2012–2014

Cyprus 
 Stelios Demetriou – Lokomotiv Plovdiv 2012–2013
Giannis Gerolemou – Tsarsko Selo 2020–2021
Panagiotis Louka – Tsarsko Selo 2020–2021
Christos Shelis – Levski Sofia (2021–)
Pieros Sotiriou – Ludogorets Razgrad 2021–

Czech Republic
David Bystroň – Levski Sofia 2008–2009
Robert Caha – CSKA Sofia 2004–2005
Tomáš Černý – CSKA Sofia 2012–2014
Pavel Čmovš – Levski Sofia 2014
Jakub Diviš – CSKA Sofia 2014–2015
Filip Hlúpik – Cherno More 2017
David Jablonský – Levski Sofia 2017–2019
Tomáš Jirsák – Botev Plovdiv 2012–2015
Přemysl Kovář – Cherno More 2016
Jiří Lenko – Lokomotiv Mezdra 2008–2009
Jan Malík – Cherno More 2016
Tomáš Mica – Naftex Burgas 2004–2005
Tomáš Okleštěk – Minyor Pernik 2011
Radek Petr – Ludogorets Razgrad 2012
Martin Slavík – Slavia Sofia 1991–00, 2001–02
Vojtěch Šrom – Cherno More 2017
Ondřej Sukup – Cherno More 2016–18

Denmark 
Emil Jørgensen – Vereya 2018

DR Congo 
Jordan Ikoko – Ludogorets Razgrad 2019–
Lynel Kitambala – Levski Sofia 2015
Jody Lukoki – Ludogorets Razgrad 2015–2020
Trésor Luntala – Lokomotiv Plovdiv 2010
Junior Mapuku – Beroe, Levski Sofia 2014–2015, 2016–2017, 2017–2018
Masena Moke – CSKA Sofia, Beroe, Cherno More, Vihren Sandanski 2000–2001, 2002–2004, 2006–2009
Aristote N'Dongala – Lokomotiv Gorna Oryahovitsa 2017; Cherno More 2018–2019
Aurélien Ngeyitala – Chernomorets Burgas; Vereya 2012–2013, 2019
Christopher Oualembo – Chernomorets Burgas 2012

Egypt 
Mahmoud Abdelaati – Svetkavitsa 2011
Mohamed Tawakol – Svetkavitsa 2011
Magdy Tolba – Levski Sofia 1992–1993

England 
Brian Howard – CSKA Sofia 2013
Ross Jenkins – Pirin Blagoevgrad 2017
Jemal Johnson – Lokomotiv Sofia 2011
Connor Randall – Arda Kardzhali 2019–20
Connor Ruane – Lokomotiv Plovdiv 2021–
Jerome Sinclair – CSKA Sofia 2020–21
Viv Solomon-Otabor – CSKA Sofia 2019–20

Ecuador 
Jordy Caicedo – CSKA Sofia 2021–
Kevin Mercado – CSKA Sofia 2017–19
Manuel Mendoźa – Levski Sofia 2002–2003

Equatorial Guinea 
Iván Bolado – CSKA Sofia 2012

Estonia 
Karol Mets – CSKA Sofia 2021–
Mark Edur – Etar Veliko Tarnovo 2020
Nikita Baranov – Beroe 2019
Edgar Tur – Botev Vratsa 2019
Trevor Elhi – Botev Vratsa 2019
Artjom Artjunin – Etar Veliko Tarnovo 2018–19
Bogdan Vaštšuk – Levski Sofia 2018–19
Daniil Ratnikov – Cherno More 2010–2011
Eduard Ratnikov – Beroe 2005–2007
Joel Lindpere – CSKA Sofia 2004–2005

Finland 
Thomas Lam – CSKA Sofia 2021–
Ville Salmikivi – Beroe 2017
Tero Mäntylä – Ludogorets Razgrad 2012–2014
Patrik Rikama-Hinnenberg – Etar 1924 2013

France 
Jérémy Acedo – Litex Lovech 2008
Cédric Bardon – Levski Sofia 2005–2007, 2009–2010
Alexandre Barthe – Litex Lovech 2008–2011, Ludogorets Razgrad 2011–2015, CSKA Sofia 2017–2018
Marc-Gauthier Bedimé – Lokomotiv Plovdiv  2017
Samir Bengelloun – Lokomotiv Plovdiv (2010–2011)
Youness Bengelloun – Lokomotiv Plovdiv (2010–2012), CSKA Sofia (2012–2013)
Alexis Bertin – Litex Lovech (2008–09)
Fabien Boudarène – Litex Lovech 2007–2008
Jean-Philippe Caillet – Litex Lovech 2005–2006
Cédric Cambon – Litex Lovech 2007–2009
Benoît Cauet – CSKA Sofia 2004–2005
Bamba Diarrassouba – Montana 2016–2017
Mory Diaw – Lokomotiv Plovdiv 2017
Karl Madianga – Lokomotiv Gorna Oryahovitsa 2017
Jérémy Faug-Porret – Chernomorets Burgas 2011–2013, CSKA Sofia 2013–2014
Jacques Fey – Etar 1924 (2012–2013)
Elliot Grandin – CSKA Sofia 2010
Steeve Joseph-Reinette – Slavia Sofia 2009–2010
Joël Kiki N'Gako – Belasitsa Petrich 2005–2008
Moussa Koita – Chernomorets Burgas 2010–2011
Florian Lucchini – Vihren Sandanski 2008–2009, Lokomotiv Plovdiv 2010–2012
Wilfried Niflore – Litex Lovech 2008–2011
Alassane N'Diaye – Lokomotiv Plovdiv, Beroe Stara Zagora, Botev Vratsa 2013–14, 2014–15, 2020–2021
Gabriel Obertan – Levski Sofia 2017–19
Jérémie Rodrigues – Lokomotiv Plovdiv, CSKA Sofia, Lokomotiv Sofia 2010–2014
Birahim Sarr – Montana 2016–2017
Saër Sène – Montana 2016–2017
Amadou Soukouna – Levski Sofia, Cherno More 2016–18
Cédric Uras – Litex Lovech 2007–2009
Daudet N'Dongala – Slavia Sofia, Botev Plovdiv, Dunav Ruse 2015–16, 2017–18, 2020
Omar Kossoko – CSKA Sofia 2013–14, Litex Lovech 2014, Botev Plovdiv 2016–17
Chris Gadi – Lokomotiv Plovdiv 2013–2014, Beroe 2014–2015, Septemvri Sofia, Etar Veliko Tarnovo 2017–2019, 2019
Anthony Belmonte – Levski Sofia 2017–2019
Bilel Aït Malek – Vereya 2018
Mohamed Chemlal – Vereya 2018
Louis Nganioni – Levski Sofia, Tsarsko Selo 2018–19, 2021
Hugo Cointard – Botev Vratsa 2019
Joakim Balmy – Cherno More 2019
Damien Marie – Tsarsko Selo 2019
Teddy Mézague – Beroe Stara Zagora 2020–2021
Aristote Madiani – Vitosha Bistritsa 2020
Keelan Lebon – Beroe Stara Zagora 2020–2022
Michel Espinosa – Botev Plovdiv 2020–2021
Salif Cissé – Tsarsko Selo, Botev Plovdiv 2020, 2020–21
Thibaut Vion – CSKA Sofia 2020–
Thomas Dasquet – Levski Sofia 2020–21
Christian Gomis – Lokomotiv Plovdiv 2020–2022
Rayan Senhadji – Montana 2020–21
Mohamed Brahimi – Tsarsko Selo, Pirin Blagoevgrad 2020–
Nicolas Taravel – Arda Kardzhali 2021
Réda Rabeï – Botev Plovdiv 2021–
Adam Boujamaa – Montana 2021
Samuel Souprayen – Botev Plovdiv 2021–
Antoine Baroan – Botev Plovdiv 2021–
Junior Nzila – CSKA Sofia 2021–2022
Yohan Baï – CSKA Sofia 2021–2022
Vincent Marcel – Lokomotiv Plovdiv 2021–
Ludovic Soares – Slavia Sofia 2021–
Kevin Tapoko – Beroe Stara Zagora 2022

Gabon 
Gaëtan Missi Mezu – Etar Veliko Tarnovo, Tsarsko Selo 2021–
 Ulysse Ndong – Lokomotiv Gorna Oryahovitsa, Slavia Sofia, Vereya 2016–18
 Alexander N'Doumbou – Vereya 2018

Gambia 
Ali Sowe – CSKA Sofia 2018–2021
Alasana Manneh – Etar Veliko Tarnovo 2018–2019
Bacari – Cherno More 2013–2017
Njogu Demba-Nyrén – Levski Sofia 2003

Georgia 
Goderdzi Machaidze – Vereya 2018–2019
Amiran Mujiri – Marek Dupnitsa, CSKA Sofia 2001–2003, 2004–2005
Avtandil Gvianidze – Botev Plovdiv 2002–2004

Germany 
Pascal Borel – Chernomorets Burgas 2009–2011
Baldo di Gregorio – Slavia Sofia 2005
Paul Grischok – Etar 1924 2013
Denis Grgic – Etar Veliko Tarnovo 2018
Steffen Karl – Lokomotiv Sofia 2001–03
Christopher Mandiangu – Septemvri Sofia 2018-2019
Matthias Morys – Chernomorets Burgas 2009–2010
Savio Nsereko – Chernomorets Burgas, Beroe Stara Zagora, Vereya 2010–2011, 2014–2015, 2017–2018
Lukas Raeder – Lokomotiv Plovdiv 2021–
Jochen Seitz – Chernomorets Burgas 2009–2011
Kristian Sprećaković – Cherno More 2008

Ghana 
Ishmael Baidoo – Septemvri Sofia 2017-2019
Bismark Charles – CSKA Sofia 2021–
Nasiru Mohammed – Levski Sofia 2019–2021
Edwin Gyasi – CSKA Sofia 2018–2020
Samuel Inkoom – Vereya 2017, Dunav 2019
Derek Asamoah – Lokomotiv Sofia 2009–2010
Godfred Bekoé – Chernomorets Burgas 2013–14
Berthran Haktam – Lokomotiv Plovdiv 2007–09
Isaac Kuoki – Beroe 2004–07
Derrick Mensah – Dunav Ruse 2018
Carlos Ohene – Beroe 2016–2018, 2019–2021, Tsarsko Selo 2021-
Francis Narh – Levski Sofia 2016–2017
Stephen Ofei – Litex Lovech 2004–05
Agyemang Opoku – Levski Sofia 2012
Michael Tawiah – Lokomotiv Mezdra, Levski Sofia 2008–2011, Vereya 2018
Bernard Tekpetey – Ludogorets Razgrad 2020–
Emmanuel Toku – Botev Plovdiv 2021-

Greece 
Dimitris Karademitros – Vihren Sandanski 2008–2009
Giorgos Katsikas – Lokomotiv Sofia 2021–
Konstantinos Kaznaferis – Lokomotiv Plovdiv 2013–2014
Christos Kontochristos – Montana (2016)
Aristeidis Lottas – Lokomotiv Mezdra 2008–2009
Christos Maladenis – Vihren Sandanski 2009
Theofilos Kouroupis – Vereya, Vitosha Bistritsa 2018–2019
Theodoros Papoutsoyiannopoulos – Slavia Sofia 2017
Antonis Stergiakis – Slavia Sofia 2015–2020
Dimitrios Chantakias – Cherno More Varna 2019–2020
Giannis Kargas – Levski Sofia 2019–20
Dimitrios Zografakis – Vihren Sandanski 2009

Guinea 
Ousmane Baldé – Vereya 2016
Ibrahima Conté – Beroe 2019–2021
Jules Keita – CSKA Sofia 2020–2021
Pa Konate – Botev Plovdiv 2021–
Larsen Touré – Levski Sofia 2013–2014

Guinea-Bissau 
Jorginho – CSKA Sofia 2018–19, Ludogorets Razgrad 2019–
Toni Silva – CSKA Sofia 2013–2015
Basile de Carvalho – Lokomotiv Plovdiv, Levski Sofia 2010–2013
Adelino Lopes – Cherno More, Beroe, Lokomotiv Sofia 2005–2009
Inzaghi Donígio – Cherno More 2006
Bruno Fernandes – Beroe 2005–06

Haiti 
Johny Placide – Tsarsko Selo (2019–2021)
Jean Ambrose – Lokomotiv GO (2016–2017)

Hungary 
Gábor Erős – Lokomotiv Plovdiv (2010–2011)
Zoltán Fehér – Vihren Sandanski (2008–2009)
István Ferenczi – Levski Sofia (2002)
Miklós Gaál – Slavia Sofia (2012)
Péter Kabát – Levski Sofia (2002)
György Sándor – Litex Lovech (2009)
Lukács Tihamér – Vihren Sandanski (2008–2009)

Iceland 
Hólmar Örn Eyjólfsson – Levski Sofia 2017–2020
Garðar Gunnlaugsson – CSKA Sofia (2008–2009)

Iraq 
Osama Rashid – Lokomotiv Plovdiv 2016
Rebin Sulaka – Arda Kardzhali, Levski Sofia 2020–21, 2021

Ireland 
Graham Carey – CSKA Sofia 2019–
Conor Henderson – Pirin Blagoevgrad 2017–18, 2021–
Cillian Sheridan – CSKA Sofia 2010–2012

Israel 
Eli Zizov – Levski Sofia 2006–2009
Tom Mansharov – Slavia Sofia 2010–2011
Taleb Tawatha – Ludogorets Razgrad 2019–2020
Dan Biton – Ludogorets Razgrad 2019–2020
Amit Bitton – Beroe Stara Zagora 2022

Italy 
Stefano Beltrame – CSKA Sofia (2020)
Luca Brignoli – Botev Plovdiv (2009)
Massimiliano Brizzi – Botev Plovdiv (2009)
Alan Carlet – Botev Plovdiv (2009)
Michele Cruciani – Chernomorets Burgas 2012
Marco D'Argenio – Botev Plovdiv (2009)
Marco Di Paolo – Botev Plovdiv (2009)
Diego Fabbrini – PFC CSKA Sofia (2019)
Roberto Floriano – Botev Vratsa 2012–2013
Emanuele Geria – Slavia Sofia (2017–2019)
Fabrizio Grillo – PFC CSKA Sofia (2010–11)
Ilario Lanna – Botev Plovdiv (2009)
Emanuele Morini – Botev Plovdiv (2009)
Andrea Parola – PFC Naftex Burgas (2000–01)
Giuseppe Pira – Botev Vratsa 2012–2013
Alberto Rebecca – Botev Plovdiv (2009)
Giovanni Speranza – Slavia Sofia 2005–06
Ciro Sirignano – Botev Plovdiv (2009)
Christian Tiboni – PFC CSKA Sofia (2010–11)
Fabio Tinazzi – Botev Plovdiv (2009)
Gilberto Zanoletti – Botev Plovdiv (2009)

Japan 
Kohei Kato – Beroe Stara Zagora 2016–2018
Daisuke Matsui – Slavia Sofia 2012–2013
Taisuke Akiyoshi – Slavia Sofia 2012–2013

Kazakhstan 
 Yerkebulan Seydakhmet – Levski Sofia 2019
 Yerkebulan Nurgaliyev – Vereya 2017

Kenya 
Aboud Omar – Slavia Sofia 2016–17

Kosovo 
Suad Sahiti – Septemvri Sofia 2019
Zenun Selimi – Lokomotiv Sofia 2002–03

Kyrgyzstan 
Nazim Ajiev – Pirin Blagoevgrad 1992
Oleg Kazmirchuk – Haskovo 1992
Asylbek Momunov – Haskovo 1992
Nematjan Zakirov – Pirin Blagoevgrad, PFC Velbazhd Kyustendil 1992–97

Latvia 
Andrejs Kovaļovs – Vereya Stara Zagora 2019
Maksims Uvarenko – CSKA Sofia (2015)
Stanislavs Pihockis – Cherno More (2009)
Viktors Morozs – CSKA Sofia 2008–2010

Lebanon 
Samir Ayass – Akademik Sofia, Minyor Pernik, Montana, Lyubimets 2007, Beroe Stara Zagora, CSKA Sofia, Dunav Ruse Botev Vratsa 2010–2011, 2012–2015, 2016–2018, 2019, 2021
Eyad Hammoud – Lokomotiv Plovdiv 2016–17

Lithuania 
Valdemar Borovskij – Beroe Stara Zagora 2015
Vytautas Černiauskas – CSKA Sofia 2017–2020
Ernestas Šetkus – Botev Plovdiv 2012–2013

Luxembourg
Aurélien Joachim – CSKA Sofia 2014–2015

North Macedonia 
Filip Antovski – Slavia Sofia 2020–21
Stefan Ashkovski – Slavia Sofia (2018–19)
Boban Babunski – CSKA Sofia (1992–94)
Dorian Babunski – Botev Vratsa (2021–)
Zoran Baldovaliev – Lokomotiv Plovdiv, Lokomotiv Sofia 2006–2010
Saša Ćirić – CSKA Sofia 1993
Mite Cikarski – Botev Plovdiv (2020-)
Aleksandar Damčevski – Chernomorets Burgas 2014
Vlatko Drobarov – Cherno More Varna (2020–)
Slavčo Georgievski – Vihren Sandanski (2006) – Slavia Sofia (2007–08)
Boban Grnčarov – Botev Plovdiv 2012-2013
Ilami Halimi – Lokomotiv Plovdiv 2004–07
Aleksandar Isaevski – Dunav Ruse 2019-2020
Boban Jančevski – Lokomotiv Plovdiv 2003–05
Darko Glišić – Septemvri Sofia 2018–19 – Arda Kardzhali 2019
Stefan Jevtoski – Lokomotiv Plovdiv 2016–2017
Vlatko Kostov – Lokomotiv Sofia (1986–88)
Dragi Kotsev – Pirin Blagoevgrad (2004–2010, 2014–2015) – Lokomotiv Plovdiv (2010-2013) – Pirin GD (2012-2013)
Denis Mahmudov – Levski Sofia (2015)
Risto Milosavov – Dobrudzha Dobrich (1995–96) – CSKA Sofia (1996–98)
Igor Mitreski – CSKA Sofia (2010)
Mario Mladenovski – Botev Plovdiv 2021–
Ilija Najdoski – CSKA Sofia (1995–96)
Jane Nikolovski – Slavia Sofia (2001–03)
Toni Pitoška – Marek Dupnitsa (2006–07)
Robert Petrov – Lokomotiv Plovdiv (2002–06) – CSKA Sofia (2006–08) – Slavia Sofia (2009–2010) – Lokomotiv Plovdiv (2017–2018)
Robert Popov – Litex Lovech 2003–08
Zekirija Ramadan – Belasitsa Petrich 2005–06
Dušan Savić – Slavia Sofia 2014–2015
Žarko Serafimovski – Lokomotiv Plovdiv 2002–03
Artim Shaqiri – CSKA Sofia 2002–03
Darko Tasevski – Levski Sofia 2007–2012, Slavia Sofia 2019–
Vančo Trajanov – Lokomotiv Plovdiv, Chernomorets Burgas, Minyor Pernik, Chernomorets Burgas, Lokomotiv Plovdiv 2002–04, 2006–09, 2010–2012, 2013–2018
Gjoko Zajkov – Levski Sofia (2021–)
Zoran Zlatkovski – Pirin Blagoevgrad (2004–05; 2009–2010) – Lokomotiv Plovdiv (2005–07) – Slavia Sofia (2008) – Vihren Sandanski (2009) – Ludogorets Razgrad (2011)

Madagascar 
Anicet Andrianantenaina – PFC Chernomorets Burgas, CSKA Sofia, Botev Plovdiv, Ludogorets Razgrad 2011–

Mali 
Garra Dembélé – Levski Sofia 2010–2011
Mamoutou Coulibaly – Cherno More 2009–2010, 2015–2016
Mamady Sidibé – CSKA Sofia 2013–2014
Alassane Diaby – Septemvri Sofia 2018–2019
Soulemayne Traore – Slavia Sofia 2017–2018
Mohamed Sylla – Vitosha Bistritsa 2019
Aboubacar Toungara – Beroe Stara Zagora 2021–

Malta 
Daniel Bogdanovic – Cherno More, Lokomotiv Sofia 2003–2004, 2008–2009
Stefan Giglio – CSKA Sofia, Lokomotiv Sofia 2000–2003
Justin Haber – Dobrudzha Dobrich 1997
Chucks Nwoko – CSKA Sofia 2001

Martinique 
Mathias Coureur – Cherno More, Lokomotiv GO, Cherno More 2014–2016, 2016, 2020–21

Mauritania 
Oumar Camara – Beroe Stara Zagora 2021–2022

Mauritius 
Kévin Bru – Levski Sofia 2013–2014

Moldova 
Artur Crăciun – Lokomotiv Plovdiv (2021–)
Andrei Ciofu – Vereya (2018) 
Alexandru Pașcenco – Vereya (2016) 
Evgheni Hmaruc – CSKA Sofia (2004–05) – Cherno More (2008)
Vladislav Nemeşcalo – Yantra (1992)

Montenegro 
Zoran Banović – Spartak Varna 2009
Veljko Batrović – Etar Veliko Tarnovo 2018–2019
Blažo Igumanović – Montana 2016–2017
Milan Mijatović – Levski Sofia 2019–20
Nemanja Šćekić – Montana 2017
Marko Vidović – Levski Sofia 2011–2012
Nikola Vujadinović – CSKA Sofia 2007–2008
Darko Vukašinović – Slavia Sofia 2007–2008
Milan Vušurović – Vereya, Botev Vratsa 2018-2019

Montserrat 
 Corrin Brooks-Meade – Montana 2016–2017

Morocco 
Bilal Bari – Montana, Levski Sofia 2020, 2021–
Chakib Benzoukane – Levski Sofia 2007–2010
Mehdi Bourabia – Lokomotiv Plovdiv, Cherno More, Levski Sofia 2014–2017
Yassine El Kharroubi – Lokomotiv Plovdiv 2015–2017
Rayan Frikeche – Lokomotiv Plovdiv 2017
Ilias Haddad – CSKA Sofia 2012
Mourad Hdiouad – Litex Lovech, CSKA Sofia 2003–2006
Abderrahman Kabous – CSKA Sofia 2007–2008
Abdelkarim Kissi – Litex Lovech (2004–05) – Beroe (2007)
Youssef Rabeh – Levski Sofia 2007–2010
Faycal Rherras – Levski Sofia 2021
Rachid Tiberkanine – Levski Sofia 2008–09

Mozambique 
Manú – Beroe Stara Zagora 2006–2007
Jerry Sitoe – Beroe Stara Zagora 2012–2013
David Malembana – Lokomotiv Plovdiv 2019–2021

Netherlands 
Fahd Aktaou – Cherno More Varna 2019–20
Vurnon Anita – CSKA Sofia 2020
Rodney Antwi – Tsarsko Selo 2019–20
Sjoerd Ars – Levski Sofia 2011–2013
Nordin Bakker – Beroe Stara Zagora 2021–2022
Serginho Greene – Levski Sofia 2010–2012
Marc Klok – Cherno More 2014–2016
Romario Kortzorg – Botev Plovdiv 2013–2014
Mitchell Burgzorg – Ludogorets Razgrad 2012–2014, Slavia Sofia 2014–2015
Rodney Klooster – Botev Plovdiv 2019
Menno Koch – CSKA Sofia 2021–
Quido Lanzaat – CSKA Sofia 2007–08
Elvis Manu – Ludogorets Razgrad 2020–2022
Ludcinio Marengo – Tsarsko Selo 2020
Jurgen Mattheij – CSKA Sofia 2020–
Dylan Mertens – Tsarsko Selo, Botev Plovdiv 2020–
Gregory Nelson – CSKA Sofia (2010–2012) – Botev Plovdiv (2015–2016)
Randy Onuoha – Neftochimic Burgas 2016–17, Slavia Sofia 2019
Sergio Padt – Ludogorets Razgrad 2021–
Luís Pedro – Botev Plovdiv, Levski Sofia 2013–2015
Lesly de Sa – Tsarsko Selo 2021
Darren Sidoel – Arda Kardzhali 2019–20
Andwélé Slory – Levski Sofia 2010
Thijs Sluijter – Litex Lovech 2007–08
Shaquill Sno – Lokomotiv Plovdiv 2021
Stijn Spierings – Levski Sofia 2020
Christian Supusepa – CSKA Sofia 2014–2015
Jasar Takak – Etar 1924 2013
Philippe van Arnhem – Botev Plovdiv 2019
Stuart van Doten – Etar 1924 2013
Jasper van Heertum – Botev Plovdiv 2022–
Yanic Wildschut – CSKA Sofia 2021–2022

Niger 
Olivier Bonnes – Lokomotiv Plovdiv (2015) – Montana (2016)

Nigeria 
Tunde Adeniji – Levski Sofia 2016–18
Kevin Amuneke – CSKA Sofia 2007
Emanuel Baba – Cherno More, Levski Sofia, Spartak Varna 2002–2004, 2006–08
Kasali Yinka Casal – Etar 1924 2012–2013
Justice Christopher – Levski Sofia (2002–04)
Victor Deniran – Slavia Sofia (2007–09) – Sportist Svoge (2009–2010) – Botev Vratsa (2011) – Montana (2012–2013)
Richard Eromoigbe – Cherno More, Levski Sofia 2002–08
Dino Eze – Beroe Stara Zagora (2004–06) – Lokomotiv Plovdiv (2006)
Stephen Eze – Lokomotiv Plovdiv (2018–2019)
Mustapha Abdullahi – Lokomotiv Plovdiv 2017
Musa Muhammed – Lokomotiv Plovdiv 2017–18
Chigozie Mbah – Slavia Sofia 2017
Daniel Ola – Botev Plovdiv 2009
Deniran Ortega – Spartak Varna (2007) – Slavia Sofia (2007–09) – Levski Sofia (2009)
Ekundayo Jayeoba – Lokomotiv Plovdiv (2000–05) – Levski Sofia (2005–08) – Chernomorets Burgas (2008–09) – Vihren Sandanski (2009–present)
Garba Lawal – Levski Sofia (2002–03)
Stephen Sunday – CSKA Sofia 2014–2015
Omonigho Temile – Cherno More (2002–03) – Levski Sofia (2003–04; 2006–07) – Chernomorets Burgas (2007–08) – Botev Plovdiv (2008–09)
Shikoze Udoji – Vihren Sandanski (2004–06) – CSKA Sofia (2007–09)

Norway 
Liban Abdi – Levski Sofia 2014–2015
Akinshola Akinyemi – Lokomotiv Plovdiv 2020
Anwar Elyounossi – Botev Plovdiv 2021–
Bjørn Johnsen – Litex Lovech 2015–2016
Kai Risholt – Etar 1924 2013

Panama 
José Córdoba – Etar Veliko Tarnovo, Levski Sofia 2021–
José Luis Garcés – CSKA Sofia 2007–08
Romeesh Ivey – Etar Veliko Tarnovo 2021–

Paraguay 
Hugo Báez – CSKA Sofia 2009–2010

Peru 
Jean Deza – Levski Sofia  (2016)
Paolo Hurtado – Lokomotiv Plovdiv 2021

Poland 
Mateusz Bąk – Etar 1924 2013
Marcin Burkhardt – Cherno More 2014–2015
Sławomir Cienciała – Etar 1924 2013
Łukasz Gikiewicz – Levski Sofia 2015
Jacek Góralski – Ludogorets Razgrad 2017–2019
Daniel Kajzer – Botev Plovdiv 2017–2019
Michał Protasewicz – Etar 1924 2013
Damian Rączka – Lokomotiv Mezdra 2009
Adam Stachowiak – Botev Plovdiv 2013–2015
Tomasz Sajdak – Slavia Sofia 2009
Jakub Świerczok – Ludogorets Razgrad 2018–2021

Portugal 
Marcio Abreu – Chernomorets Burgas (2007–2011)
Dinis Almeida – Lokomotiv Plovdiv (2019–2021)
João Amorim – Arda Kardzhali (2019)
Diogo Andrade – Vihren Sandanski (2008–09)
Leandro Andrade – Cherno More Varna (2020–)
Ricardo André – Cherno More (2007–09) – Chernomorets Burgas (2010–2011)
Rúben Brígido – Beroe Stara Zagora (2018–2019)
João Paulo Brito – CSKA Sofia (2002–04)
Jordão Cardoso – Cherno More Varna (2018)
Tiago Costa – Vihren Sandanski (2007)
Fabinho – Cherno More (2018)
Filipe da Costa – CSKA Sofia (2008) – Levski Sofia (2009)
Erivaldo – Beroe Stara Zagora (2020–21)
Luis Dias – Vihren Sandanski (2007–08)
Paulo Teles – Lokomotiv Plovdiv (2016–17)
Pedro Eugénio – Beroe Stara Zagora (2012-2013) – Haskovo (2014-2015) –Cherno More (2015-2016) – Vereya (2016–17) – Beroe (2017–18) – Beroe (2019–20)
Nuno Fonseca – Lokomotiv Mezdra (2009)
Jose Emilio Furtado – Vihren Sandanski (2005) – CSKA Sofia (2006–07)
Claude Gonçalves – Ludogorets Razgrad 2021–
Pedro Lagoa – Etar Veliko Tarnovo, Botev Vratsa 2020, 2020–21
Tozé Marreco – Lokomotiv Mezdra (2009)
Rui Miguel – Lokomotiv Mezdra (2008) – CSKA Sofia (2009–2010)
Fausto Lourenco – Lokomotiv Mezdra (2008–09)
Mesca – Beroe Stara Zagora (2018–19)
Filipe Nascimento – Levski Sofia (2018–2020)
Pedrinha – Chernomorets Burgas (2010)
Nuno Pinto – Levski Sofia (2011–2013)
Nuno Reis – Levski Sofia 2018–2020
Cristóvão Ramos – Levski Sofia 2011–2014
Celso Raposo – Lokomotiv Sofia 2021–
Tiago Rodrigues – CSKA Sofia 2017–2021
Ruca – Beroe Stara Zagora 2022–
Hugo Santos – Vihren Sandanski (2007–09)
Josué Sá – Ludogorets Razgrad 2020–
Sandro Semedo – Dunav Ruse (2019)
David Simão – CSKA Sofia 2016–2017
David Silva – Lokomotiv Mezdra (2008) – CSKA Sofia (2009)
João Silva – Levski Sofia (2012–2013)
Hugo Simoes – Lokomotiv Mezdra (2009)
Eduardo Simões – Vihren Sandanski (2007–08)
Rodrigo Vilela – Cherno More Varna (2020–)
Nuno Tomás – CSKA Sofia (2019–21)
Ukra – CSKA Sofia (2018)
Vitinha – Ludogorets Razgrad, Cherno More Varna (2012–2018)
Zé Gomes – Cherno More Varna (2021–)

Romania 
Ionuţ Bădescu – Naftex Burgas (2004–05)
Alexandru Benga – Botev Plovdiv, Septemvri Sofia (2014; 2018–19)
Florin Bratu – Litex Lovech (2010)
Sergiu Buș – CSKA Sofia (2014) – Levski Sofia (2017–19)
Costin Caraman – Dobrudzha Dobrich (1993–94)
Alexandru Curtean – Botev Plovdiv (2014)
Dragoș Firțulescu – Beroe Stara Zagora, Dunav Ruse, Slavia Sofia (2017–21)
Alexandru Giurgiu – Slavia Sofia (2016–17)
Petre Grigoraş – Levski Sofia (1993–94)
Dragoș Grigore – Ludogorets Razgrad (2018–2021)
Sergiu Homei – Neftochimic Burgas (2016–17)
Claudiu Keșerü – Ludogorets Razgrad (2015–2021)
Srdjan Luchin – Botev Plovdiv (2014) – Levski Sofia (2016–17)
Cosmin Moți – Ludogorets Razgrad (2012–21)
Cristian Muscalu – Chernomorets Burgas (2010)
Ionuț Neagu – Cherno More (2019)
Sergiu Negruț – Beroe Stara Zagora (2017–18)
Emil Ninu – Levski Sofia (2014)
Daniel Pancu – CSKA Sofia (2010)
Georgian Paun – CSKA Sofia (2012)
Alexandru Păcurar – CSKA Sofia (2012)
Bogdan Pătraşcu – Litex Lovech (2000–01)
Florentin Petre – CSKA Sofia (2006–08; 2009–10)
Alexandru Piţurcă – CSKA Sofia (2006–07)
Adrian Popa – Ludogorets Razgrad (2018–19)
Andrei Prepeliță – Ludogorets Razgrad (2015–16)
Florin Prunea – Litex Lovech (2000)
Valeriu Răchită – Litex Lovech (2000–02)
Laurenţiu Reghecampf – Litex Lovech (1998–99)
Neluț Roșu – Levski Sofia (2017–18)
Dorin Rotariu – Ludogorets Razgrad (2021–)
Eugen Trică – Litex Lovech (2003–05) – CSKA Sofia (2005–07)
Ianis Zicu – CSKA Sofia (2011)

Russia 
Aleksandr Bukleyev – Beroe (2008)
Vladimir Gerasimov – Cherno More (2001–03) – Levski Sofia (2003–04)
Konstantin Golovskoy – Levski Sofia (2002–04)
Dmitri Ivanov – Vereya Stara Zagora 2019
Konstantin Kaynov – Levski Sofia (2000–01)
Sergey Kuznetsov – Volov Shumen (1994–95)
Dar Korolev – Botev Vratsa 2020
Yevgeni Landyrev – Litex Lovech (2003–04)
Daniil Maykov – Slavia Sofia (2017)
Denis Davydov – CSKA Sofia 2019-20
Mikhail Maryushkin – Pirin Blagoevgrad (1993–94)
Sergey Mironov – Sliven (2008–09)
Anton Polyutkin – Montana (2016)
Vladislav Radimov – Levski Sofia (2000–01)
Serder Serderov – Slavia Sofia (2016-2017)
Nikita Sergeyev – Slavia Sofia (2016)
Oleg Shalayev – Slavia Sofia (2013–2014) – Haskovo (2014)
Yevgeni Tyukalov – Slavia Sofia (2016)
Ivan Selemenev – Dunav Ruse (2019)

Saudi Arabia 
 Hussein Abdulghani – Vereya 2017–2018

Scotland 
Tony Watt – CSKA Sofia 2019–20
John Inglis – Levski Sofia (1999-00) – Botev Plovdiv (2001–02)

Serbia 
Milan Jokić – Tsarsko Selo 2021–
Slobodan Rubežić – Arda Kardzhali 2021–
Alen Stevanović – Tsarsko Selo 2021–
Miloš Petrović – Lokomotiv Plovdiv 2018–2020, 2021–
Aleksandar Stanisavljević – Slavia Sofia 2018–19
Zoran Gajić – Arda Kardzhali 2019-20
Nemanja Ivanov – Slavia Sofia 2018
Dušan Mladenović – Etar Veliko Tarnovo 2018
Miloš Cvetković – Levski Sofia 2017–2019
Marko Adamović – Beroe Stara Zagora (2017–18) 
Nebojša Ivančević – Montana (2017)
Đorđe Ivelja – Montana (2017) 
Bojan Jorgačević – Levski Sofia 2015–2017
Pavle Delibašić – Lokomotiv Plovdiv (2008–09) – Minyor Pernik (2010)
Zvonimir Stanković – Lokomotiv Sofia (2009–2010)
Bratislav Ristić – Slavia Sofia (2009)
Milan Milutinović – Lokomotiv Plovdiv (2008–09)
Goran Janković – Minyor Pernik (2008–2011)
Zoran Cvetković – Vihren Sandanski (2003–06) – Lokomotiv Mezdra (2008–09)
Nenad Nastić – CSKA Sofia (2008–09)
Pavle Popara – Slavia Sofia (2008–2013)
Srdjan Novković – Slavia Sofia (2008–09)
Igor Bondžulić – Lokomotiv Sofia (2008–09)
Igor Tasković – Marek Dupnitsa (2007–09) – Beroe (2009)
Zoran Belošević – Slavia Sofia (2007)
Nenad Lazarevski – Slavia Sofia (2006–07)
Aleksandar Mutavdžić – CSKA Sofia (2006)
Oliver Kovačević – CSKA Sofia (2006–07)
Vladimir Đilas – Marek Dupnitsa (2006–07) – Lokomotiv Sofia (2007–09)
Dejan Maksić – CSKA Sofia (2005)
Ivan Čvorović – PFC Naftex Burgas (2004–07) – Chernomorets Burgas (2007–08) – Minyor Pernik (2009–2012) – Ludogorets Razgrad (2012-2016) – Levski Sofia (2016) – Botev Plovdiv (2017–present) (Also holds Bulgarian citizenship)
Vladan Milosavljević – Cherno More (2004–05) – Beroe (2008)
Dragan Isailović – Litex Lovech (2004–05)
Uroš Golubović – Spartak Varna (2003–04) – Lokomotiv Sofia (2004–08) – Litex Lovech (2008–2011) – Ludogorets Razgrad (2011-2013)
Slavko Matić – Slavia Sofia (2003–04) – CSKA Sofia (2005–07)
Saša Antunović – Spartak Varna (2002–04) – Lokomotiv Sofia (2004–08)
Saša Bogunović – Litex Lovech (2002–03)
Marko Palavestrić – Spartak Varna (2002–03; 2007–08)
Gabrijel Radojičić – Belasitsa Petrich (2002–03)
Saša Zimonjić – Levski Sofia (2002–03)
Saša Simonović – Levski Sofia (2002–05; 2009–present) – Vihren Sandanski (2005–06) – Slavia Sofia (2006–08) – Lokomotiv Mezdra (2008–09)
Velimir Ivanović – Slavia Sofia (2002–06) – Spartak Varna (2007–09) – Minyor Pernik (2009–2010)
Darko Savić – Spartak Varna (2002–04) – Lokomotiv Sofia (2004-2011)
Saša Viciknez – PFC Naftex Burgas (2002–05)
Darko Spalević – Cherno More (2002–03) – Lokomotiv Plovdiv (2003–04)
Budimir Đukić – Slavia Sofia (2001–05) – Spartak Varna (2007–08)
Nenad Lukić – CSKA Sofia (2001–02) – Spartak Varna (2002–03)
Miodrag Pantelić – Levski Sofia (2000–03)
Mićo Vranješ – CSKA Sofia (2000–03)
Rade Todorović – Slavia Sofia (2000–02)
Dragan Žilić – CSKA Sofia (2000–01)
Mile Knežević – Spartak Varna (2000–01)
Kuzman Babeu – Slavia Sofia (2000–01)
Miroslav Savić – Levski Sofia (2000–01)
Miroslav Milošević – Cherno More (2000–04; 2005–07)
Nebojša Jelenković – Litex Lovech (1999-08; 2009–2013)
Ivan Litera – CSKA Sofia (1999) – Velbazhd Kyustendil (2000)
Slavoljub Đorđević – Spartak Varna (1999-00)
Dragoljub Simonović – Litex Lovech (1998-01) – CSKA Sofia (2001–02)
Bratislav Mijalković – Spartak Varna (1998–99)
Igor Bogdanović – Litex Lovech (1997–99)
Vuk Rašović – Slavia Sofia (1997–98)
Božidar Đurković – CSKA Sofia (1997–98)
Saša Vukojević – Lokomotiv Plovdiv (1993–94)

Senegal 
Alioune Badará – Etar Veliko Tarnovo (2017–18)
Stéphane Badji – Ludogorets Razgrad 2019–2022
Papa Alioune Diouf – Litex Lovech (2011)
Alioune Fall – Beroe Stara Zagora 2020–2022
Ibrahima Gueye – CSKA Sofia (2001–06)
Mansour Gueye – Lokomotiv Plovdiv (2016)
Jackson Mendy – CSKA Sofia (2013-2014) – Litex Lovech (2014-2015)
Mouhamadou N'Diaye – Dunav Ruse (2018–2019)
Younousse Sankharé – CSKA Sofia (2020–21)
Khaly Thiam – Levski Sofia 2018–2020

Sierra Leone
Sulaiman Sesay-Fullah – Etar 1924 2013
Alie Sesay – Arda Kardzhali 2019

Slovakia 
Tomáš Košút – Vereya Stara Zagora (2019)
Martin Polaček – Levski Sofia (2018–19)
Boris Sekulić – CSKA Sofia (2018–2019)
Dušan Perniš – Beroe (2017–2021)
Kristián Koštrna – Pirin Blagoevgrad (2016-2017)
Marek Kuzma – Cherno More (2016–2018)
Roman Procházka – Levski Sofia (2012-2013, 2014–2018)
Peter Petráš – Levski Sofia (2010)
Daniel Kiss – Levski Sofia (2008)
Radoslav Zabavník – CSKA Sofia (2004–05)
Ľubomír Guldan – Ludogorets Razgrad (2011-2013)
Marián Jarabica – Ludogorets Razgrad (2011-2012)
Jakub Hronec – Kaliakra Kavarna (2011-2012)

Slovenia 
Tadej Apatič – Slavia Sofia (2014)
Roman Bezjak – Ludogorets Razgrad  (2012–2015)
Dejan Djermanovič – Litex Lovech (2011)
Elvedin Džinić – Botev Plovdiv (2013)
Suvad Grabus – Ludogorets Razgrad (2011)
Denis Halilović – CSKA Sofia (2011)
Marko Jakolić – Montana (2017)
Sebastjan Komel – Cherno More Varna (2013)
Dejan Komljenović – Lokomotiv Plovdiv (2009)
Dino Martinović – Lokomotiv Plovdiv, Vereya Stara Zagora, Etar Veliko Tarnovo (2016–) (2018) (2019–20)
Rene Mihelič – Levski Sofia (2013)
Mitja Mörec – CSKA Sofia (2008) – Slavia Sofia (2009)
Milivoje Novakovič – Litex Lovech (2005–06)
Alen Ožbolt – Lokomotiv Plovdiv (2018–2020)
Matej Poplatnik – Montana (2015)
Aleksander Rodić – Litex Lovech (2006–07)
Jure Travner – Ludogorets Razgrad (2011)
Saša Živec – CSKA Sofia (2011)

South Africa 
Ricardo Nunes – Levski Sofia (2014)
May Mahlangu – Ludogorets Razgrad  (2018–2019)
MacDonald Mukansi – Lokomotiv Sofia (1999-02) – CSKA Sofia (2002–03)
Simba Marumo – Chernomorets Burgas (1999-00)

South Korea 
Lee Hyung-Sang – Spartak Varna (2008)

Spain 
Nacho Monsalve – Levski Sofia 2021
Pablo Álvarez – Cherno More Varna 2021–
Higinio Marín – Ludogorets Razgrad 2020–
Paco Puertas – Etar Veliko Tarnovo 2020–21
Julio – Tsarsko Selo 2020
David Bollo – Slavia Sofia 2019
Raúl Albentosa – CSKA Sofia 2019–20
Jordi Gómez – Levski Sofia 2017–18
Pirulo – Cherno More 2017
Miguel Ángel Luque – Lokomotiv Plovdiv 2016-2017
Añete – Levski Sofia 2014–2015, 2016-2017
Marcos García Barreno – Beroe Stara Zagora 2016 
Miguel Bedoya – Levski Sofia 2014-2016
Brian Oliván – CSKA Sofia 2014
Cristian Hidalgo – Cherno More 2013
Antonio Tomás – CSKA Sofia 2012
Rubén Palazuelos – Botev Plovdiv 2012
Toni Calvo – Levski Sofia 2011-2012
Didi González – Slavia Sofia 2009–2010
Francisco Martos – CSKA Sofia 2006–07

Suriname 
Shaquille Pinas – Ludogorets Razgrad 2021–

Sweden 
Jack Lahne – Botev Plovdiv 2022
Kevin Höög Jansson – Botev Plovdiv 2021
Mehmet Mehmet – Etar 1924 2013
Sonny Karlsson – Etar 1924 2013
Fredrik Risp – Levski Sofia 2011–2012
Simon Sandberg – Levski Sofia 2016–2017

Switzerland 
Karim Rossi – Tsarsko Selo 2021
Dragan Mihajlović – Levski Sofia 2021–2022
Valentino Pugliese – Lokomotiv Plovdiv, Tsarsko Selo, Beroe Stara Zagora 2020–21, 2022–
Miodrag Mitrović – Cherno More Varna (2019–20)
Zoran Josipovic – Beroe Stara Zagora (2019–20)
Davide Mariani – Levski Sofia 2018–19, Beroe Stara Zagora 2022
Mihael Kovačević – Beroe Stara Zagora (2014)
Giuseppe Aquaro – CSKA Sofia (2010–11)
Baykal Kulaksızoğlu – Lokomotiv Sofia (2011)

Tajikistan 
Nuriddin Davronov – Dunav Ruse 2016-2017
Iskandar Dzhalilov – Dunav Ruse, Lokomotiv Plovdiv 2016–2017, 2018
Parvizdzhon Umarbayev – Lokomotiv Plovdiv 2016–

Togo 
Serge Nyuiadzi – CSKA Sofia 2012–2013 
Paul Adado – Litex Lovech, Vidima-Rakovski 2002–2005

Trinidad & Tobago 
Brent Rahim – Levski Sofia 2002

Tunisia 
Khaled Ayari – Lokomotiv Plovdiv 2017
Aymen Belaïd – Lokomotiv Plovdiv 2013 – Levski Sofia 2014–2015, 2018-2019
Tijani Belaïd – Lokomotiv Plovdiv 2013-2014
Selim Ben Djemia – Vereya 2017–2018
Mohamed Ben Othman – Lokomotiv GO 2016–2017
Syam Ben Youcef – Beroe Stara Zagora 2022
Lamjed Chehoudi – Lokomotiv Sofia 2014–2015
Nader Ghandri – Slavia Sofia 2021
Enis Hajri – Chernomorets Burgas 2009–2012
Sofien Moussa – Lokomotiv GO 2016–2017
Aymen Souda – Lokomotiv GO, Lokomotiv Plovdiv, Pirin Blagoevgrad 2015–
Hamza Younés – Botev Plovdiv, Ludogorets Razgrad 2013–2015

Turkey 
Orhan Aktaş – Haskovo 2015
Erol Alkan – Beroe Stara Zagora, Etar Veliko Tarnovo 2018–2020, 2021
Güven Güneri – Akademik Sofia 2010
Fatih Yılmaz – Etar 2013

Turkmenistan 
Igor Kislov – Etar 1990–96

Ukraine 
Oleksiy Bykov – Lokomotiv Plovdiv 2021
Hennadiy Hanyev – Vereya Stara Zagora, Dunav Ruse, Beroe Stara Zagora, CSKA 1948 2019–
Yevhen Borovyk – Cherno More 2017
Yevhen Dobrovolskyi – Vereya Stara Zagora 2019
Serhiy Doronchenko – Etar 1924 1993
Oleksiy Larin – Dunav Ruse 2017–18
Ihor Oshchypko – Botev Plovdiv 2016
Oleksandr Koval – Levski Sofia 2000
Oleg Morgun – Etar 1924, Levski Sofia (1991–1995)
Ihor Plastun – Ludogorets Razgrad 2016–2018, 2021–
Denis Prychynenko – CSKA Sofia 2014–15
Serhiy Rudyka – Vereya Stara Zagora 2019
Ivan Shariy – Etar 1924 (1989-1991)
Eduard Tsykhmeystruk – Levski Sofia 2000–01
Denys Vasilyev – Vereya Stara Zagora 2018–19

Uruguay 
Sasha Aneff – Botev Vratsa 2012–2013
Nicolás Raimondi – Loko Plovdiv 2010–11
Robert Mario Flores – Litex Lovech 2011
Sebastián Flores – Cherno More, Botev Plovdiv 2009–2011
Edgardo Simovic – Vihren Sandanski 2008
Nico Varela – Botev Plovdiv 2015

Uzbekistan 
Fevzi Davletov – Belasitsa Petrich (1999–00)

Venezuela 
Adalberto Peñaranda – CSKA Sofia 2020–21
Hermes Palomino – Cherno More Varna 2011–13
Marlon Antonio Fernández – Cherno More Varna 2012
Héctor Gonzalez – Chernomorets Burgas 2009–10
Gabriel Cichero – Vihren Sandanski 2007
Alejandro Cichero – Litex Lovech 2005–08

Notes

References
 “А” група погледна към елита на Европа at 7sport.net

Bulgarian A PFG
Foreign football players in A PFG
Association football player non-biographical articles